Udaipurwati is a small town and a municipality in Jhunjhunun district in the Indian state of Rajasthan.
Jhunjhunu city, Sikar, Sri Madhopur and Neem ka thana are some more developed towns near Udaipurwati. Udaipurwati (उदयपुरवाटी) is a town and tahsil in the Jhunjhunu district in Rajasthan. Its ancient name, mentioned in Harsha Inscription 961 AD (L-39), was Udarbhatika (उदर्भटिका).

Demographics 
As of the 2001 Indian census, Udaipurwati had a population of 27,831.  Males constitute 52% of the population and females 48%.  Udaipurwati has an average literacy rate of 56%, lower than the national average of 59.5%: male literacy is 69%, and female literacy is 43%.  In Udaipurwati, 19% of the population is under 6.

See also
Thikanas of Shekhawati
Sarju Sagar dam

References

Cities and towns in Jhunjhunu district